Phleum alpinum is a species of grass known by the common names alpine cat's-tail, alpine timothy and mountain timothy.

Distribution
Phleum alpinum has a circumboreal distribution, inhabiting northern areas of the Northern Hemisphere, as well as extending down through the Americas to southern South America. It can be found on islands in the subantarctic region such as South Georgia Island, on which it is one of the most common plant species.

Description
Phleum alpinum is a perennial bunchgrass forming loose clumps 20 to 60 centimeters tall. The inflorescence is a cylindrical to oval mass of spikelets up to 6 centimeters long and 1.2 wide.

References

External links
Jepson Manual Treatment - Phleum alpinum
USDA Plants Profile
Grass Manual Treatment
Phleum alpinum - Photo gallery

Pooideae
Bunchgrasses of North America
Bunchgrasses of South America
Native grasses of California
Grasses of the United States
Grasses of Canada
Flora of Mexico
Flora of the California desert regions
Plants described in 1753
Taxa named by Carl Linnaeus
Flora without expected TNC conservation status